Bas Yun Hi is a 2003 Indian Hindi-language romantic comedy film directed by Raja Menon. The film stars Purab Kohli, of Channel V fame, and Nandita Das.

Cast 
Purab Kohli as Aditya
Nandita Das as Veda
Rajiv Gopalakrishnan as Rohan
Sameer Malhotra as Kabir
Sandhya Shetty as Saraswathy alias Sara
Tannishtha Chatterjee as Sona
Parmita Katkar as Tara

Release 
Rediff wrote that "Though shorter in length than a commercial movie, it still drags. The filmmakers may have tried to portray a slice of urban life. They probably did not realise it would take more than just a prank to show its true colours". Bollywood hungama gave the film a rating of one out of five stars and wrote that "On the whole, BAS YUN HI neither entertains, nor enlightens. It may appeal to a very, very small segment of cinegoers ï¿½ the college crowd only ï¿½ but even they won't come out feeling satiated. Poor".

Soundtrack 
 Bas Yun Hi - Mehnaaz
 Ek Ajnabi Haseena Se - KK
 Kaise Kahoon Kya Ho Gaya - Shaan, Vivenne Pocha
 Jao Na Yun Chodkar - KK
 Ittefaq - Mehnaaz
 Ye Kaisa Ehsaas Hai - KK, Mahalaxmi Iyer
 Mix Yun Hi - Abhay Rumde

References

External links 

Indian romantic comedy films
2003 romantic comedy films
2003 films
2000s Tamil-language films